The Dubrovnik-Neretva County is the southernmost county of Croatia, located in south Dalmatia. The county seat is Dubrovnik and other large towns are Korčula, Metković, Opuzen and Ploče. The Municipality of Neum, which belongs to neighbouring Bosnia and Herzegovina, divides the county in two parts which are connected only by the Pelješac Bridge. The southern part of the county consists of Dubrovnik and the surrounding area, including the Pelješac peninsula, and the islands of Korčula, Lastovo, Mljet, Šipan, Lopud and Koločep. The northern part of the county includes the Neretva Delta, the Baćina lakes north of Ploče, and a swath of hinterland near the southernmost slopes of Biokovo and around the hill of Rujnica. The northern part of the Mljet island is a national park. The Lastovo archipelago is a designated nature park. The southernmost tip of the county is the Prevlaka peninsula at the border with Montenegro. It is the only Croatian county that borders Montenegro.

Although the 9 kilometres-long stretch of coast belonging to Neum effectively makes the southern part of the county an exclave (disconnecting it from mainland Croatia) it is still connected with the rest of the country via the Pelješac Bridge. Road traffic going to and from Dubrovnik through Neum is usually less subject to customs controls in order to reduce the traffic congestion. The road connecting Dubrovnik to the rest of the country via Neum has one lane per direction and bus lines passing through Neum often make rest stops there so that passengers can take advantage of lower Bosnian taxes and purchase tobacco and alcoholic beverages as they tend to be cheaper there.

Administrative division
On the local level, the Dubrovnik-Neretva County is further subdivided into 5 cities (grad, pl. gradovi) and 17 municipalities (općina, pl. općine):

 City of Dubrovnik (county seat)
 Town of Korčula
 Town of Metković
 Town of Opuzen
 Town of Ploče
 Municipality of Blato
 Municipality of Dubrovačko Primorje
 Municipality of Janjina
 Municipality of Konavle
 Municipality of Kula Norinska
 Municipality of Lastovo
 Municipality of Lumbarda
 Municipality of Mljet
 Municipality of Orebić
 Municipality of Pojezerje
 Municipality of Slivno
 Municipality of Smokvica
 Municipality of Ston
 Municipality of Trpanj
 Municipality of Vela Luka
 Municipality of Zažablje
 Municipality of Župa Dubrovačka

Demographics

As of the 2011 census, the county had 122,568 residents. The population density is 69 people per km2.

At the 2011 census, ethnic Croats formed the vast majority with 94.4% of the population, followed by Serbs at 1.7% and 3.9% being other ethnic groups combined.

Protected areas
 Mljet National Park
 Lastovo archipelago nature park

References

External links

  

 
Enclaves and exclaves
Counties of Croatia